Franz Schuh (born 15 March 1947) is an Austrian novelist, literary critic and, above all, essayist in the tradition of Karl Kraus and Alfred Polgar. Schuh was born, and lives, in Vienna, where, just like his predecessors, he prefers to write in one of the traditional coffeehouses.

Life 
Franz Schuh studied philosophy, history and German studies in Vienna and graduated with his doctorate. 1976-80 he was Secretary General of the Grazer Autorenversammlung, then editor of "Wespennest" (wasp nest) and head of the essayist and literary program of the publisher Deuticke. He works as a freelancer for various broadcasters and national newspapers and as a lecturer at the University of Applied Arts Vienna. He was also a guest at the "Literaturhaus Wien" (House of Literature in Vienna). Since June 2009 he writes the column "Crime & Punishment" in the magazine Datum and talks a lot on the public radio program Ö1 among other things, in his "Magazine of happiness".

Select bibliography 
 Liebe, Macht und Heiterkeit (1985)
 Landnahme. Der österreichische Roman nach 1980 (1989)
 Schreibkräfte. Über Literatur, Glück und Unglück (2000)
 Der Stadtrat. Eine Idylle (2000)
 Schwere Vorwürfe, schmutzige Wäsche (Heavy Reproaches, Dirty Linen) (Leipzig Book Fair Prize, 2006).

Schuh also edited the Peter-Henisch-Reader Figurenwerfen (2003).

Awards 
 1986: Austrian State Prize for Cultural Journalism
 1987: City of Vienna Award for Journalism (Preis der Stadt Wien für Publizistik)
 2000: Jean Améry Prize
 2006: Leipzig Book Fair Prize, category "Sachbuch/Essayistik", for Schwere Vorwürfe, schmutzige Wäsche
 2006: Davos Swiss Media Award for outstanding achievement in journalism
 2009: Essay Prize Tractatus, Philosophicum Lech
 2022: Honorary doctor, University of Klagenfurt

References

External links 
 Biography in the aeiou Encyclopedia
 Biography from the University of Graz web site (in German)
 Leipzig Book Fair Prizes 2006

1947 births
Living people
20th-century Austrian novelists
21st-century Austrian novelists
Austrian male novelists
Austrian essayists
Austrian literary critics
Writers from Vienna
Male essayists
20th-century essayists
21st-century essayists
20th-century Austrian male writers
21st-century male writers